is a Japanese professional shogi player ranked 5-dan.

Early life and education
Kuroda was born on September 26, 1996, in Matsuyama, Ehime Prefecture. He learned how to play shogi from his father when he was abo ut six years old, and began going to the Matsuyama shogi center shortly thereafter to improve his game. As a sixth-grade elementary school student in 2008, he finished runner up in the 33rd , defeating fellow future professional shogi player Yasuhiro Masuda in the semi-finals, and also won the upper-grade section of the 7th . In September 2008, he was accepted into the Japan Shogi Association (JSA) apprentice school under the guidance of shogi professional Mamoru Hatakeyama at the rank of 6-kyū.

In order to participate in the apprentice school games held at the JSA's Kansai Branch in Osaka, Kuroda would take a night ferry from Matsuyama. He was promoted to the rank of apprentice professional 3-dan in 2013, and just missed out on obtaining full professional status and the corresponding rank of 4-dan in October 2016 after finishing third in the 59th 3-dan League (April 2016September 2016) with a record of 12 wins and 6 losses. Kuroda actually finished tied with several other players with 12 wins and second place, but his lower league seed meant that he was awarded third place and a promotion point instead. Kuroda once again fell one win short of promotion to 4-dan in the 62nd 3-dan League (October 2017March 2018) and the 63rd 3-dan League (March 2018September 2018), but finally obtained full professional status in April 2019 after finishing second in the 64th 3-dan League (October 2018March 2019) with a record of 13 wins and 5 losses.

Promotion history
Kuroda's promotion is as follows:
 6-kyū: September 2008
 3-dan: April 2013 
 4-dan: April 1, 2019 
 5-dan: February 4, 2021

References

External links
ShogiHub: Professional Player Info · Kuroda, Takayuki

Japanese shogi players
Living people
Professional shogi players
Professional shogi players from Ehime Prefecture
People from Matsuyama, Ehime
1996 births